Cymothoe haimodia, the haimodia red glider, is a butterfly in the family Nymphalidae. It is found in eastern Nigeria and Cameroon. The habitat consists of forests.

Females closely resemble moths of the genus Aletis, of which they might be mimics.

The larvae feed on Rinorea species.

References

Butterflies described in 1887
Cymothoe (butterfly)
Butterflies of Africa
Taxa named by Henley Grose-Smith